Krzysztof Michał Szyga (born 6 February 1966 in Katowice) is a Polish politician. He was elected to Sejm on 25 September 2005 getting 3,882 votes in 31 – Katowice, running for Civic Platform.

In 2011, he joined Poland Comes First.

See also
Members of Polish Sejm 2005-2007

External links
Krzysztof Szyga - parliamentary page - includes declarations of interest, voting record, and transcripts of speeches.

Poland Comes First politicians
Civic Platform politicians
Members of the Polish Sejm 2005–2007
1966 births
Living people